Hypercompe ochreator is a species of tiger moth first described by Felder and Rogenhofer in 1874. It is found in Guatemala.

References

Hypercompe
Moths described in 1874